Spartan Park is an outdoor football ground in Avalon, Lower Hutt, the home of the American Football Wellington's Hutt Valley Spartans.

American football venues in New Zealand